The Indian Naval Hydrographic Department (INHD), headed by the Chief Hydrographer to the Government of India, is an Indian government agency responsible for hydrographic surveys and nautical charting in India. Its headquarters National Hydrographic Office is located in Dehradun, Uttarakhand beside the Principal Controller of Defense Accounts Office (Air Force). Presently, the department is equipped with Seven indigenously built survey ships including a catamaran hull survey vessel (CHSV). The National Institute of Hydrography is the training institute to impart knowledge regarding hydrography and to train its personnel.  Two more ships are currently being constructed and is expected to be commissioned into service by 2025-26.

The department is also responsible for making electronic navigational charts officially on behalf of the government of India. The department has also signed memoranda of understanding with various countries for surveying their waters as part of international cooperation.

History

Pre-independence
Hydrography in India originated back in the 17th century. The first chart of Indian Ocean was compiled by Thorntons of the British East India Company in 1703, which is considered as a major step towards the development of nautical charts of India. In 1874,  the Indian Marine Survey Department was established in Calcutta; later it became a part of Royal Indian Navy.

Post-independence
After Indian independence in 1947, the department continued its functions under the Surveyor-in-Charge of the Marine Survey of India from Bombay. Later the office was shifted to Dehradun by renaming it as Naval Hydrographic Office headed by Chief Hydrographer of the Navy, which was later re-designated Chief Hydrographer to the Government of India in 1964. In view of international role of India in hydrography, the office was renamed once again in 1997 as National Hydrographic Office. Captain (later Admiral and Chief of the Naval Staff) Jal Cursetji was the first Indian to serve as the Chief Hydrographer of the Navy.

National Hydrographic Office
The National Hydrographic Office, headed by the Chief Hydrographer to the Government of India, is the headquarters of Indian Naval Hydrographic Department stationed at Dehradun. It is responsible for the publication of nautical charts relating to Indian on behalf of the government.

Chief Hydrographer to the Government of India
The Chief Hydrographer to the Government of India is the executive head of the Indian Naval Hydrographic Department. The Chief Hydrographer is a vice admiral from the Indian Navy. The Chief Hydrographer is also the coordinator for charting Area "J" in the North Indian Ocean and NAVAREA VIII coordinator.

Organisational structure
The department is headed by Chief Hydrographer, assisted by a staff officer. The organisation is further divided into 6 divisions.

Ships
Presently 7 ocean-going survey ships are in service with the department. All these ships belong to Sandhayak class, whose design was adopted as basic one, and later added on with minor changes in tandem with the existing technology, except INS Makar which belongs to Makar class.

References

Indian Navy
National hydrographic offices